Ngouba Singh (born 1 March 1995 in Manipur) is an Indian professional footballer who plays as a defender for Royal Wahingdoh F.C. in the I-League.

Career
Singh was a part of the Royal Wahingdoh squad that won the 2014 I-League 2nd Division and thus promotion to the I-League. He made his I-League debut on 15 February 2015 against Sporting Goa. Singh started as Royal Wahingdoh won the match 2–0.

Career statistics

References

1995 births
Living people

Indian footballers
Royal Wahingdoh FC players
Association football defenders
Footballers from Manipur
I-League players
I-League 2nd Division players